The 2018 Combined Japan Cup was the first of the competition. It was organized by the JMSCA (Japan Mountaineering and Sport Climbing Association). It was held from 23 to 24 June 2018 in Morioka city, Iwate Prefecture. The athletes competed in combined format of three disciplines: speed, bouldering, and lead. The winner for men was Tomoa Narasaki and for women was Akiyo Noguchi.

Schedule

Men

Women

References 

Climbing Japan Cup
2018 in sport climbing